Plasmodium hydrochaeri is a parasite of the genus Plasmodium subgenus Vinckeia.

Like all Plasmodium species P. hydrochaeri has both vertebrate and insect hosts. The vertebrate hosts for this parasite are rodents.

Description 

This species was first described in 2009 by Dos Santos et al. 

The only known host is the capybara (Hydrochaeris hydrochaeris).

Geographical occurrence 

This species is found in South America. It has only been described in captive capybaras at the Sanctuary Zoo in Brazil.

Hosts and disease

P. hydrochaeri was isolated from capybara with no clinical signs of disease, suggesting that the parasite causes little to no disease in this host.

References 

holaspi